James Hanson Lemon Sr. (May 14, 1903 – July 20, 1977) was an investment banker from Washington, D.C. He is best known as the co-owner of the Washington Senators of the American League with James Johnston from  through , and the principal owner and chairman of the board in . Lemon was born in Washington in 1903. He received a Bachelor of Science degree from Princeton University in 1925.

During the 1930s, Lemon was well known in the world of contract bridge, serving as president of the Washington Bridge League and, in 1939, of the American Contract Bridge League.

In 1963, Johnston and Lemon purchased the two-year-old Senators expansion franchise from their original principal owner, Elwood "Pete" Quesada. One year after Johnston's death in December 1967, Lemon sold the franchise to Bob Short. Lemon remained with the Senators as chairman of the board, retaining a minority interest in the team. Short later moved the Senators to Arlington, Texas, where they became the Texas Rangers. He was a frequent golf partner of Dwight Eisenhower, who appointed him as a special ambassador to Ghana.

Lemon was not related to Jim Lemon, the former outfielder who was field manager on the Senators in 1968.

Lemon died in 1977 at Washington at 74. His wife Martha died on December 21, 1996.

Notes

References
Texas Rangers owners

1903 births
1977 deaths
Ambassadors of the United States to Ghana
American contract bridge players
Businesspeople from Washington, D.C.
Major League Baseball owners
Washington Senators (1961–1971) executives
Washington Senators (1961–1971) owners